The Paraje Solo Formation is a geologic formation in Mexico. It preserves fossils dating back to the Neogene period.

See also

 List of fossiliferous stratigraphic units in Mexico

References
 

Neogene Mexico